Krisean Lopez is a Belizean footballer who currently plays for Verdes in the Premier League of Belize and the Belize national team.

International career 
Lopez made his national team debut for Belize on 4 June 2018 in a 0–0 against Barbados.

On 5 August 2018, Lopez scored his first international goal, in a 1–0 win against Barbados. Lopez scored his first competitive goals on 7 September 2018, scoring twice in a 4–0 win against the Bahamas, as part of 2019–20 CONCACAF Nations League qualifying.

International goals 
Scores and results list Belize's goal tally first.

References

External links 
 Krisean Lopez at Premier League of Belize
 

1998 births
Living people
People from Belize City
Association football midfielders
Belizean footballers
Belize international footballers
Premier League of Belize players
Verdes FC players
Wagiya FC players